Thomas E. Miller (born November 7, 1948) is an American former basketball coach.  He served as the head men's basketball at Cornell University from 1980 to 1986, the University of Colorado Boulder from 1986 to 1990, and the United States Military Academy from 1990 to 1993, compiling a career college basketball coaching record of 119–225.

Head coaching record

References

1948 births
Living people
American men's basketball coaches
American men's basketball players
Army Black Knights men's basketball coaches
Army Black Knights men's basketball players
College men's basketball head coaches in the United States
Colorado Buffaloes men's basketball coaches
Cornell Big Red men's basketball coaches
Forwards (basketball)
Indiana Hoosiers men's basketball coaches